Pleiku is a city in central Vietnam, located in the Central Highlands region. It is the capital of the Gia Lai Province. Many years ago, it was inhabited primarily by the Bahnar and Jarai ethnic groups, sometimes known as the Montagnards or Degar, although now it is inhabited primarily by the Kinh ethnic group. The city is the centre of the urban district of Pleiku which covers an area of 261 km².

As of 2003 the district had a population of 186,763. The city sits at the junction of several national roads—National Route 14 to Kon Tum in the north and Buôn Ma Thuột in the south and National Route 19 to Stœng Trêng in Cambodia in the west (via Ratanakiri Province) and to Bình Định Province in the east. The city is home to the Hoàng Anh Gia Lai football club. Pleiku is served by Pleiku Airport in the near outskirts of the city.

History

First Indochina War 
At the end of the First Indochina War, in June 1954, the French Army Groupe Mobile 100 was ordered to fall back from An Khê to Pleiku and then to reopen Route Coloniale 14 between Pleiku and Buôn Ma Thuột. This led to the last battle of the war: the Battle of Mang Yang Pass.

Second Indochina War 

Pleiku was strategically important during the Vietnam War because it was the primary terminus of the military supply logistics corridor extending westwards along Highway 19 from the coastal population centre and port facilities of Qui Nhơn. Additionally, its central location on the plateau, between Kon Tum to the north, Buôn Ma Thuột to the south, and the North Vietnamese Army's base areas inside Cambodia to the west made Pleiku the main centre of defense of the entire highland region of the Republic of Vietnam. This was obvious to both sides; the United States established an armed presence very early in the conflict at Camp Holloway, and the Việt Cộng attack on this base in early 1965 was one of the key escalating events that brought U.S. troops into the conflict.

On 15 June 1972, Cathay Pacific Flight 700Z, operating a Convair 880 (VR-HFZ) from Bangkok to Hong Kong, disintegrated and crashed while the aircraft was flying at 29,000 feet (8,800 m) over Pleiku, Vietnam after a bomb exploded in a suitcase placed under a seat in the cabin, killing all 81 people on board.

After the fall of Buôn Ma Thuột to a major North Vietnamese assault in early 1975, and the resulting insecurity of National Route 19 leading from Qui Nhơn, the president, Nguyễn Văn Thiệu, ordered the hasty evacuation of Pleiku. The military operation to attempt the withdrawal of ARVN forces, down the poorly maintained tertiary road LTL-7B through Ayun Pa to Tuy Hòa, led to a catastrophe in which over 100,000 evacuees from Pleiku and Kon Tum were killed or left stranded without support.

Climate

References

 
Populated places in Gia Lai province
Districts of Gia Lai province
Cities in Vietnam
Provincial capitals in Vietnam